This is a list of motor vehicle deaths in Iceland by year. The first fatal vehicle accident in Iceland occurred 29 June 1919, when 66-year-old pedestrian Ólöf Margrét Helgadóttir was hit in Bankastræti at the intersection with Ingólfsstræti. She sustained severe injuries when the front wheels of the vehicle went over her and died the following day.

List

Graph

See also
List of motor vehicle deaths in Australia by year
List of motor vehicle deaths in Japan by year
List of motor vehicle deaths in Thailand by year
Motor vehicle fatality rate in U.S. by year

External links
Accident report 2000, Icelandic Transport Authority 
Accident statistics, Icelandic Transport Authority 
Fatalities in traffic since the beginning of car age in Iceland, 1915–2014, Icelandic Transport Authority 

Motor vehicle deaths in Iceland by year

Iceland transport-related lists
Motor vehicle deaths in Iceland by year
Iceland